Drive is an album by the American guitarist Russ Freeman, released in 2002 for the Peak label. This album reached #7 on Billboard's Contemporary Jazz chart.

Track listing
Guitarland (written by: Russ Freeman) - 4:47
Villa By the Sea (Russ Freeman) - 4:54
Soul Dance (Russ Freeman / Barry Eastmond) - 4:41
Brighter Day (Russ Freeman) - 4:32
Boys of Summer (Mike Campbell / Don Henley) - 4:36
Anywhere Near You (Russ Freeman / Barry Eastmond) - 4:45
Drive (Russ Freeman) - 4:30
Cool In the Shade (Russ Freeman) - 4:16
East River Drive (Grover Washington, Jr.) - 4:35
Bellagio (Russ Freeman) - 4:16

Personnel
Russ Freeman - Guitar, Keyboards
Chris Botti - Trumpet
Barry Eastmond - Keyboards
Bill Heller - Keyboards
Jeff Lorber - Keyboards
Eric Marienthal - Saxophone
Jason Miles - Keyboards
Jeff Mirinov - Guitar
Will Lee - Bass
Buddy Williams - Drums
Pablo Batista - Percussion

Charts

References
Russ Freeman Chart History

External links
Russ Freeman-Drive at AllMusic
 Rippingtons Official website

2002 albums
Peak Records albums
Smooth jazz albums
Jazz fusion albums by American artists
Russ Freeman (guitarist) albums